Federalism in Ethiopia can be best explained by considering the ethnic and geographic diversity of modern-day Ethiopia, interpreted through the history of the nation’s reunification. Ethiopia contains over 80 ethnic groups of varying sizes, languages, religions and customs. According to the 2007 census, the top seven groups constitute 83% of the population. 
Ethiopia is mainly a rural country, with an urbanisation rate of only 23.2% (2023)  and exhibits a wide variety of topography that impacts agricultural and economic activity.

Following the dissolution of the Derg in 1991, ending the Ethiopian Civil War, Ethiopia was ruled by a transitional government lasting until 1995, at which time the 1995 constitution was enacted by the Ethiopian People's Revolutionary Democratic Front (EPRDF), based upon ethnic based federalism. The purpose was to alleviate ethnic tensions and to allow for greater regional autonomy. Each ethnic territory has the right to secede, causing great controversy among Ethiopian nationalists and its diaspora, who feared it could increase ethnic tensions and decentralization of the government. Article 39, Section 1 states: "Every nation, nationality and people has an unconditional right to self-determination including the right to section (sic)."
 
During this period of rule by Meles Zenawi's administration under a federal system, a number of socio-economic and political reforms were introduced, liberalizing the rigid state socialism of the Derg regime. This led to significant economic growth of more than 7% over at least a decade, a GDP growth rate well in excess of those of neighbouring countries. However, concurrently, Ethiopia continued to be affected by inter-ethnic clashes, resulting in an escalation of political instability and perceived deficiencies of civil administration has shifted Ethiopia towards an authoritarian regime.
Under Prime Minister Abiy Ahmed's administration, despite a promising start, with cessation of the simmering tensions with Eritrea, for which Abiy Ahmed was awarded the Nobel Peace Prize in 2019, and some further political liberalization, a deep-seated political dispute arose between Abiy Ahmed’s central government and Tigray Region’s provincial government, leading in 2020 to a widespread civil war, the Tigray War, characterised by significant civilian and military casualties, alleged atrocities on both sides and massive displacement of refugees.

Ethiopia has always oscillated in and out of centralisation of power. This is was accelerated under the 19th century emperors Tewodros II (1855-68) and Yohannes IV (1872-89). This was replicated in modern times under the Stalinist Derg regime, after the fall of the Derg, the federalism introduced in 1991 by the Tigray People’s Liberation Front (TPLF).

Historically, the kingdom of Abyssinia, as it was generally called prior to the mid-19th century, consisted mainly of the Amhara and Tigrayans. These are northern people who share a similar language, culture and customs, who now make up c. 24% and 6% respectively of modern Ethiopia. Tewodros II reunified northern Ethiopia starting from 1855, while his successor Yohannes IV embarked on a series of brutal military campaigns between 1880-1889 to conquer and annex the southern and eastern regions, namely western Oromo, Sidama, Gurage, Wolayta and other groups, leading largely to the current national borders.

The inhabitants of these southern states had different languages and customs; most were Muslim, but particularly the most populous group, the Oromos, 34% currently, occupied valuable agricultural and developable lands which now contain the capital Addis Ababa, the heart of urban Ethiopia and its industrial hub on traditional Oromo lands.

The conquest involved mass killings, which would now be termed genocide, enslavement, land confiscation and forcible conversion to Ethiopian Orthodox Christianity, motivated by a cultural contempt for what were considered inferior peoples. These historical memories persist in part, aggravated even today by ‘land grabs’ in the southern Oromo heartland by the ruling non-Oromo hegemony and by similar competition for land and resources between the Amhara and Ethiopian Somalis in the north. 

The centralised Ethiopian Empire under Haile Selassie was abolished following the Ethiopian Revolution, the Mengistu and communist Derg coup of 1974, replaced by an equally centralised Marxist-Leninist system, including the continuation of the military campaigns started by Haile Selassie in 1961 against the resistance within Eritrea, annexed in 1961, which persisted until 1991, and against the Somali Ogaden invasion of 1977/78. 

Following the dissolution by the TPLF of the Derg in 1991, which ended the Ethiopian Civil War and established independence for Eritrea, Ethiopia formed a transitional government along federal lines which lasted until 1995. The 1995 Constitution of Ethiopia was promulgated by the Ethiopian People's Revolutionary Democratic Front (EPRDF), which enshrined a form of ethnic-based federalism, consisting of 11 ethno-linguistically defined regional states and ywo chartered cities. The states are: Afar; Amhara, Benishangul-Gumuz; Gambela; Harari; Oromia; Somali; the Southern Nations, Nationalities, and Peoples' Region; Tigray; Sidama; and South West Ethiopia. The chartered cities are Addis Ababa, the country's capital, and Dire Dawa. The federal structure was intended to alleviate the persistent historical ethnic tensions by establishing regional autonomy and a degree of self-rule. Article 39, Section 1 states: "Every nation, nationality and people has an unconditional right to self-determination including the right to section." Each ethnic territory was thus given the right to secede, which was welcomed by the federally-minded but proved controversial amongst supporters of Ethiopian nationalism and its diaspora, especially the previously dominant Amhara, who feared it would decentralise government and induce ethnic tensions. 

After the 1995 general election, Meles Zenawi, chairman of the Tigray People's Liberation Front, was appointed as prime minister. His government reversed the communist policies of the Derg and progressively encouraged privatization of government companies, farms, lands, and investments. This socioeconomic and partial political liberalization within a federalist system, combined with a return of considerable foreign investment led to significant economic growth, double-digit in the last nine years before his sudden death in 2012. His deputy Hailemariam Desalegn, assumed power, which was only confirmed by elections in 2015. Under the leadership of Hailemariam, the Tigray People's Liberation Front and EPRDF maintained the same policies until 2018, earning Ethiopia the status as the fastest-growing economy in Africa. While Meles introduced many social reforms, there was still a notable degree of political and media suppression, coupled with allegations of election meddling in 2005. The TPLF, drawn from only 6% of the population, was seen as unduly favourable to Tigrayans, and resented by the majority Oromos (34%) and Amhara (27%), with ethnic clashes also involving Ethiopian Somalis (6%).

Prelude
Ethiopian statehood has been opposed by various different factions since the 19th-century conquest by Emperor Menelik II. Marxist–Leninist ideological movements appeared at the end of the 1960s. At the beginning of the decade, nationality questions were raised during the reign of Emperor Haile Selassie, culminating in an armed uprising in Eritrea, and the subsequent Eritrean War of Independence in 1962. In 1974, a revolution was ignited by several classes as a response to the imperial government's failure to adapt to public demand on the economy, which resulted in the overthrow of Haile Selassie's government by the military committee of the Derg; Ethiopia then fell under a military dictatorship. The reversal of previous imperial policy came into effect, and nationalization of land was codified in 1975. In 1976, the Derg declared its goals for establishing scientific socialism through a program called the "National Democratic Revolution Programme (NDRP)". The program also affirmed the equality of ethnic groups in Ethiopia, and self-determination through regional autonomy.

Early activities and policies
Following the 1991 downfall of the Derg at the hands of the rebel coalition, the Ethiopian People's Revolutionary Democratic Front (EPRDF), the EPRDF convened the July 1991 Peace and Democracy conference, inviting 25 political organizations. This conference approved the 1948 Universal Declaration of Human Rights (UDHR), asserting  multi-party democracy, freedom of association and speech for Ethiopia. It also granted Eritrean secession from Ethiopia, and ethnic secession from the territory. Following the conference, the Transitional Government of Ethiopia (TGE) was established with an unelected legislative body known as the Council of Representatives (CoR). The CoR had 87 seats with 32 political organizations, with the EPRDF allocating 32 seats for itself, while the Oromo Liberation Front, a spearhead succorer of the EPRDF, had 12 seats, and the other groups one to three seats. In 1992, the EPRDF was almost set up executive power; underwent consolidated administration based on 14 ethnolinguistic regions in Ethiopia. However, the Ethiopian People's Revolutionary Party (EPRP) and the Amhara's All-Ethiopian Socialist Movement (MEISON) withdrew from the league on the basis of superfluous concession. Shortly, the OLF withdrew in the 1992 regional election, a controversial event where the EPRDF elected its allies as constituent regional parties. With assent, the Constituent Assembly, dominated by the EPRDF, approved the 1994 constitution with elements of charter recognizing self-determination, secession, democratic and human rights, and formation of nine regions.

Meanwhile, there was debate over the 'pragmatic and promise' order raised during the 1995 election, and some political parties boycotted the election due to their perceived fear of "open political space". In addition, the EPRDF used paradox in theory of the concurrency of Soviet hierarchical categorization of ethnic groups in terms of "nations, national groups and peoples'" and the 1994 constitution defined Joseph Stalin's concept of "nation". Article 20/5 states:

Indeed, the Soviet's "nations, nationalities and peoples'"—as a hierarchical organization constituting federalism—influenced the now implementing ethnic federalism in Ethiopia. Article 39, 1 section states: "Every nation, nationality and people has an unconditional right to self-determination including the right to section."

Major conflicts

Ogaden insurgency

Ethnic and tribal conflict within the Somali Region occurred shortly after its formation in 1992. In May 1991, a pan-Islamist Al-Ittihad al-Islam (Islamic Unity) was established with the aim of consolidating Somalis with empire in case of Ogaden region. Al-Ittihad was accused by the government of orchestrating bombing attacks between 1996 and 1997. Following this, the Ethiopian military crossed southern Somalia and successfully neutralized the wing. The Ogaden National Liberation Front began operating in the region following a naming dispute what they called it "Ogaadeenia", established in the Gulf state in March 1984. After the Ogaden War and subsequent Ethiopian Somalia War terminated in the Djibouti agreement in 1988, the Derg-sponsored Western Somali Liberation Front (WSLF) mediated the stalemate intermittently. Since 1991, OLF rendered to the dominant political party, and the largest within interim Somali regional assembly after the December 1992 elections. In the assembly held in the same year, controversial issues were raised including a failed proposition of Dire Dawa to be the capital of the region.

The ONLF preferred Gode despite non-Ogaden clans opposing the move, who worked for Jijiga to make a new capital. In 1994, Somali's capital transferred to Jijiga due to security issues between the ONLF and EPRDF. The first Somali Region president was Abdullahi Mohammed Sa'adi from the ONLF. In July 1993, the government sacked the new president over alleged fund misuse, eventually creating setback to EPRDF–ONLF relations, and instability in the region. As of 2002, eight presidents have lost their positions. In May 1994, ONLF held secessionist referendum despite EPRDF determined declining the referendum as "illegal resolutions". Similarly, numerous pro-rebel insurgency organizations thrived such as Democratic Unity Party, the Ethiopian Somali Democratic Movement, and the Democratic Action.

The ONLF insurgency was officially launched on 22 February 1994 after government troops killed 81 people in an ONLF rally in the town of Wardheer (Werder). In response, ONLF rebels killed two and four government soldier in Har Weyne on 27 April 2004 and 8 April 2004 respectively. On 16 June 2004, the government killed ten civilians in a truck travelling between Qabridaharre (Kebri Dahar) and Wardheer. On 1 October, the government clashed with ONLF rebels in the Ogaden region, which left 17 government soldiers dead. Sporadic government raids and rebel insurgency were ensued between 2004 and 2010, when representatives of the Ethiopian government and the ONLF faction signed peace agreement on 13 October 2010. Again the government reinstated the campaign against ONLF on 23–25 November 2010, and continued for more than couple years. Negotiations were attempted in first round in Nairobi on 6–7 September 2012, with the delegation of government's Defense Minister Siraj Fegessa and ONLF's Admiral Mohamed Omar Osman in that October. The process continued on 25 December in Addis Ababa inviting ONLF's Abdinur Abdulaye Farah. On 26 January 2014, two negotiators from splinter of ONLF, Painito Bera Ng'ang'ai and James Ngaparini, were kidnapped by Kenyan police before turning to the Ethiopian government.

During the administration of Prime Minister Abiy Ahmed, the ONLF ultimately declared ceasefire on 12 August 2018, after a call by Abiy. On 22 October 2018, Eritrea hosted the final peace treaty of Ethiopia government and ONLF, with respect leaders from Foreign Affairs Minister Workneh Gebeyehu and Admiral Mohammed Omar Osman.

Oromo Liberation Front and Oromo Liberation Army

The Oromo Liberation Front insurgency traces back with its founding in 1973 in response to the perceived deficient rule of Haile Selassie, and the Derg mass arrests in particular area of Galamso, Badessa, Mechara, Bike, Balbaleti. On the other hand, the OLF established with an objective of self-determination of Oromo people: "realization of the national self-determination of the Oromo people" and "believes the Oromo people are still being denied their fundamental rights by Ethiopian colonialism" according to their website.

During the struggle against the Derg military government, the OLF was closely involved in an alliance with spearhead political groups like the Tigray People's Liberation Front (TPLF) and the Eritrean People's Liberation Front (EPLF), both of whom formed a coalition party named the Ethiopian People's Revolutionary Democratic Front in 1988. In June 1992, the OLF withdrew from the EPRDF coalition as a result of fear of Tigrayan hegemony, triggering Oromo-led insurgency which left thousands deported to Kenya and Somalia. The relations of Eritrea and Ethiopia worsened by 1993, by which Ethiopia accused Eritrea for supplying arms to OLF insurgents. In May and June of that year, the OLF sent troops backed by tanks to Somalia. Similarly, the Al-Ittihad al-Islam took raids in the border of southern Ethiopia, and the government failed to access the Ethio-Kenyan border where OLF insurgents believed to operate there. In 1995, the government arrested 280 members of the OLF accused of rebellion in the town of Zeway. 

After its chairman Galassa Dilbo resigned in 2003, OLF members met with Eritrea in Asmara in December 2004, Dawud Ibsa Ayana succeeded the chairman position. Between 2001 and 2007, the OLF was involved in a territorial stalemate, where the situation fell in the foundation of Ethiopian–Eritrean border conflict. In the Bergen meeting, several OLF committee members reportedly called for participation in 2005 general election, regarding the group's isolation a big issue ravaging OLF leaderless. On 15 September 2006, veteran Ethiopian Army commanders Brigadier General Hailu Gonfa and Gemechu Ayana joined OLF after serving for TPLF.

In January 2005, sixteen Eritrean political parties met in Khartoum, Sudan, to establish the Eritrean Democratic Alliance (EDA) with Ethiopian support. In May 2006, four opposition parties turned to insurgency. They formed the Alliance for Freedom and Democracy (AFD) aiming in peaceful nonviolent struggle against the government, despite pledged rebellion against any authority. Main members of the coalition had their headquarters in Asmara, Eritrea.

In August 2011, Bekele Gerba, an Oromo activist was detained by the government in alleged connection with the OLF, along with Olbana Lelisa. Agence France-Presse amplified the government statement quoting "[t]hese people were arrested because the police had found evidence that had linked them with clandestine activities carried out by the OLF". Paris-based newspaper the Sudan Tribune released a statement that the two people were convicted to the Ethiopian Federal Higher Court for having links to the OLF by recruiting students to the organization and using membership. In 2010, the UN Committee Against Torture accused the government of alleged torturing supporters of insurgent groups like the OLF. On 27 June 2014, the OLF announced formation of two organizations in their websites also known as the "OLF National Council" and the "OLF Transitional Authority", and agreed to combine military and leadership structure.

A successful peace process was held in Asmara during Abiy Ahmed's tenure on 7 August 2018, signing the Reconciliation Agreement. It was signed between the President of the Oromia Region Lemma Megersa with his OLF counterpart Dawud Ibsa Ayana. According to Eritrean information minister Yemane Gebremeskel, the agreement stated "The OLF will conduct its political activities in Ethiopia through peaceful means". Meanwhile, its wing, the Oromo Liberation Army, failed to reach the peace agreement, seeing "no room for a peaceful political resolution", and continued a separated movement aside the OLF.

On 2 November 2020, 54 people (mostly Amhara women, children and elderly people) were killed in the village of Gawa Qanqa by attackers declaring themselves under the OLA, after the Ethiopian National Defense Force withdrew from the area without explanation. The OLA denied any responsibility. The Ethiopian Human Rights Commission (EHRC) reported that 210 people were killed in Oromia Region's Gida–Kirimu on 18 August 2021. State affiliated independent commission said that the witness identified gunmen related to the OLA after security force withdrew the area.

The rebel group began actively operating in the Western Oromia since the Tigray War. Amnesty International reported that the OLA repeatedly committed human rights abuse targeted mostly Amhara minorities using massacre, extrajudicial killings of captives and sexual violence targeting women and girls. On 1 May 2021, Ethiopia formally approved for the TPLF and the OLA to be designated terrorist organizations. On 5 November 2021, the OLA, together with eight rebel political organizations, formed the United Front of Ethiopian Federalist and Cofederalist Forces, in order to "dismantle Abiy's government by force or by negotiation, and then form a transitional authority".

Afar–Somali clashes

The Afar–Somali clashes began in 2014 when ethnic Somalis claimed regions including the Awash River and highway and railway conjunctions between Addis Ababa and Djibouti, which provided significant resources to them. Another issue was disputed special kebeles inhabited by Somali's Issa clan, such as Adaytu in the Mille woreda, Undufo in the Gewane woreda, and Gedamaytu in the Amibara woreda. In 2014, the federal government delimited the boundary between the two regions, resulting in the loss of three villages in the Somali Region to the Afar Region.

Further violence escalated on 27 October 2020, killing 27 people according to the Ethiopian government. On 27 July 2021, the Somali Region government said Afar militias looted the town of Gedamaytu, also known as Gabraiisa with undisclosed casualties. An estimated 300 Somalis were killed in the clash that began on 24 July where their bodies were reportedly scattered in the roads of Garbe Isse.

Oromo–Somali clashes

The Oromo–Somali clashes escalated after the failed resolution of demarcating the boundary between Oromia and Somali regions since decades. In 2004, a referendum was held with more than 420 kebeles being transferred to the Oromia Region, leaving the Somali minorities displaced. The Jarso population in Somali Region also voted to join Oromia.

According to the 10th round (March–April) of the Displacement Tracking Matrix (DTM)1, at least 10,737,642 people where displaced as of mid-2018, with majority displacement occurred in the clash of Oromia and Somali.

Under Abiy Ahmed

In 2018 TPLF’s Hailemariam, after 3 years of growing discontent and clashes, was replaced by Abiy Ahmed, the first Oromo leader in Ethiopia, traditionally Amhara dominated in earlier times. Initially, Abiy an elected member of the Ethiopian parliament, and a member of the Oromo Democratic Party (ODP), one of the then four coalition parties of the EPRDF, introduced more reforms and liberalisation, sidelining the TPLF, disbanding the EPRDF in 2019 and forming his own party, the Prosperity Party. He ended the 20-year post-war territorial stalemate between Ethiopia and Eritrea for which he won the 2019 Nobel Peace Prize. In June 2020, Abiy, in concert with the National Election Board of Ethiopia (NEBE), decided to postpone scheduled parliamentary elections due to the COVID-19 pandemic. This move prompted criticism, especially from the opposition and raised questions about the delay's constitutional legitimacy.

In November 2020, simmering ethnic and political tensions, as well as attacks on the Ethiopian National Defense Force (ENDF) Northern Command, exploded into the ongoing Tigray War between the combined forces of the ENDF and the Eritrean Army against forces loyal to the TPLF, an ethnic party which dominated the erstwhile ruling EPRDF coalition during a nearly thirty-year period marked by rapid development alongside increasing interethnic tension, as well as those loyal to significant allied groups such as the Oromo Liberation Army, now currently in loose alignment with TPLF. 

This conflict which displaced up to 2 million people, still continues unabated, and has spread into Amhara and Afar regions, with repeated breakdowns of ceasefires, despite support for negotiations from the US and Kenyan governments. Both sides have large heavily armed troop emplacements in close proximity, trade and food blockades still persist, creating widespread hunger, estimated to affect 4.8 million people, mainly Tigrayan.

Economy

Ethiopia has achieved economic growth more than 7% in the past decade. During Meles Zenawi's administration, Ethiopia boosted the fastest economic growth in Africa in terms of GDP with double-digit economic growth for his last 9 years, resuming 7 years after his death where his party, the TPLF, continued the same policy. The raise of agricultural output led 11% economic growth for the 2011–12 fiscal year that ended in June, though inflation elevated by 20% in July. 

In addition, the country maintained loans from foreign countries. Over the past years alone, the USAID lent $675 million and the Britain's Department for International Development (DfID) lent an average of £331m a year until 2015. The Ethiopian economy in manufacturing grew from 4% (2010) to 6% (2018), which is still at a reduction level as a result of trade deficiency. Foreign currency may be acquired to strengthen foreign direct investment in the labor-intensive manufacturing industries and industrial zones. Ethiopia actively invested in China, Turkey and India in primary sectors including textiles, leather-making, and shoe-making with cheap labor. The accessibility with rural areas often met low productivity and has yet comparative advantage. Ethiopia has a high debt with 60% of its 2018 GDP, half of its external debt. The IMF warned of the high risk of debt remaining stable. Acquisition of foreign currency dominated in the future includes (1) 22 domestic industrial zones that is currently underdeveloping, (2) gas development promoted by China in northeastern Ogaden and completion of gas pipelines linking to Djibouti, (3) transmittance from around three million Ethiopian diaspora, (4) electricity exports to Kenya, by which the Grand Ethiopian Renaissance Dam is expected to deliver adequate to neighboring countries and (5) privatization of state-owned enterprises such as Ethio telecom and Ethiopian Airlines.

In September 2019, Prime Minister Abiy Ahmed announced the launch of Homegrown Economic Reform Agenda (HERA), a program designated to advance the GTP with economic activity shifts from agriculture to industry. HERA also expected to suspend the country's low middle-income rate to 2030, after originally aimed to 2025 under GTP. Also, the government announced the shortage of foreign currency, and vows to conduct reforms within three years targeting increased productivity. Contrary, the designation is yet unclear whether further measure should be taken by HERA, or the integration of GTP in the third phase in HERA.

See also
 Ethiopian People's Revolutionary Democratic Front
 Transitional Government of Ethiopia
 1995 Constitution of Ethiopia
 Ethnic discrimination in Ethiopia
 Ethiopian civil conflict (2018–present)
 Oromo conflict
 Tigray War

References

Government of Ethiopia
20th century in Ethiopia
21st century in Ethiopia
History of Ethiopia